Zoffa Yarawi (born 1 January 1954) is a Papua New Guinean boxer. He competed in the men's light flyweight event at the 1976 Summer Olympics.

References

External links
 

1954 births
Living people
Light-flyweight boxers
Papua New Guinean male boxers
Olympic boxers of Papua New Guinea
Boxers at the 1976 Summer Olympics
Commonwealth Games competitors for Papua New Guinea
Boxers at the 1974 British Commonwealth Games
Boxers at the 1982 Commonwealth Games
Place of birth missing (living people)